A Piece of Cake is a 1948 British fantasy comedy film directed by John Irwin and starring and co-written by the husband and wife team of Cyril Fletcher and Betty Astell as well as Laurence Naismith and Jon Pertwee. It was made at Highbury Studios as a second feature for release by the Rank Organisation.

Plot
Set in the austere post–World War II British world of rationing, Cyril dreams up an ode to an imaginary character named Merlin Mound who can provide anything one can wish.  Merlin becomes real and grants his host's wishes; not by conjuring the items out of thin air, but obtaining them from other people's ownership, which leads to trouble.

Cast
 Cyril Fletcher as Cyril Clarke
 Betty Astell as Betty Clarke
 Laurence Naismith as Merlin Mound
 Jon Pertwee as Mr Short
 Sam Costa as Les Millins
 Miki Hood as Mrs Short
 Tamara Lees as Dinner Guest
 Audrey White as Dinner Guest
 Philip Saville as Dinner Guest
 Ethel Coleridge as Mrs Fiddle
 Johnnie Schofield as Window Cleaner
 Richard Gilbert as Head waiter
 Harry Fowler as Spiv
 Arthur Laurence as Police inspector
 Sam Kydd as Soldier

References

External links

1948 films
1940s fantasy comedy films
British fantasy comedy films
Films set in London
Films shot at Highbury Studios
British black-and-white films
1948 comedy films
1940s English-language films
1940s British films